Latvia is set to participate in the Eurovision Song Contest 2023 in Liverpool, United Kingdom, with "" performed by Sudden Lights. The Latvian broadcaster Latvijas Televīzija (LTV) organised the national selection  2023 in order to select their entry for the contest.

Background 

Prior to 2023, Latvia has participated in the Eurovision Song Contest 22 times since its first entry in 2000. Latvia won the contest once in 2002 with the song "I Wanna" performed by Marie N. Following the introduction of semi-finals in 2004, Latvia was able to qualify for the final between 2005 and 2008. Between 2009 and 2014, the nation had failed to qualify to the final for six consecutive years before managing to qualify to the final in 2015 and 2016. Latvia had failed to qualify to the final for five consecutive contests since 2017, including with their 2022 entry "Eat Your Salad" performed by Citi Zēni.

Before Eurovision

2023 
On 3 August 2022, LTV confirmed its participation in the Eurovision Song Contest 2023. On 21 September 2022, it was announced by LTV that  had been confirmed as the national final format to select Latvia's entry for the Eurovision Song Contest, and opened submissions for the selection.

Format 
The format of the competition consisted of two shows: a semi-final and a final. The semi-final, which was held on 4 February 2023, featured 15 competing entries from which the top ten entries advanced to the final. The final, held on 12 February 2023, selected the Latvian entry for Liverpool from the remaining entries. Results during the semi-final and final shows were determined by the 50/50 combination of votes from a jury panel and a public vote, with both the jury and public vote assigning points from 1–8, 10, and 12 based on the number of competing songs in the respective show. Viewers were able to vote via telephone or via SMS.

Competing entries 
On 21 September 2022, the broadcaster opened the song submission for artists to apply, with the deadline set for 1 December 2022. It was later announced that 121 songs were submitted at the conclusion of the submission period. The submitted songs were evaluated by a jury panel appointed by LTV and selected 15 performers and songs, which were announced on 5 January 2023. Among the competing artists is Justs, who represented Latvia in the Eurovision Song Contest 2016. On 6 January 2023, Saule was disqualified from the competition due to the song being previously performed in 2021.

Semi-finals 
The semi-final took place on 4 February 2023. In the semi-final, 14 acts competed and the top ten entries qualified to the final based on the combination of votes from a jury panel and the Latvian public.

Final 
The final took place on 11 February 2023. The ten entries that advanced from the semi-final will compete. The song with the highest number of votes based on the combination of votes from a jury panel and the Latvian public, "" by Sudden Lights, was declared the winner. In addition to the competing entries, the show featured guest performances from Eurovision Song Contest 2019 winner Duncan Laurence, and Elīza Legzdiņa and Beanie from Rudimental.

At Eurovision 
According to Eurovision rules, all nations with the exceptions of the host country and the "Big Five" (France, Germany, Italy, Spain and the United Kingdom) are required to qualify from one of two semi-finals in order to compete for the final; the top ten countries from each semi-final progress to the final. The European Broadcasting Union (EBU) split up the competing countries into six different pots based on voting patterns from previous contests, with countries with favourable voting histories put into the same pot. On 31 January 2023, an allocation draw was held, which placed each country into one of the two semi-finals, and determined which half of the show they would perform in. Latvia has been placed into the first semi-final, to be held on 9 May 2023, and has been scheduled to perform in the first half of the show.

References 

2023
Countries in the Eurovision Song Contest 2023
Eurovision